Plantago macrorhiza is a species of perennial herb in the family Plantaginaceae. Individuals can grow to 5 cm.

Sources

References 

macrorrhiza
Flora of Malta